The culture of Europe is rooted in its art, architecture, film, different types of music, economics, literature, and philosophy. European culture is largely rooted in what is often referred to as its "common cultural heritage".

Definition 

There were a great number of perspectives which can be taken on the subject, it is impossible to form a single, all-embracing conception of European culture. Nonetheless, there are core elements which are generally agreed upon as forming the cultural foundation of modern Europe. One list of these elements given by K. Bochmann includes:
 A common cultural and spiritual heritage derived from Greco-Roman antiquity, Christianity, Judaism, the Renaissance, and its Humanism, the political thinking of the Enlightenment, and the French Revolution, and the developments of Modernity, including all types of socialism;
 A rich and dynamic material culture that has been extended to the other continents as the result of industrialization and colonialism during the "Great Divergence";
 A specific conception of the individual expressed by the existence of, and respect for, a legality that guarantees human rights and the liberty of the individual;
 A plurality of states with different political orders, which are feeding each other with new ideas;
 Respect for peoples, states, and nations outside Europe.

Berting says that these points fit with "Europe's most positive realizations".
The concept of European culture is generally linked to the classical definition of the Western world. In this definition, Western culture is the set of literary, scientific, political, artistic, and philosophical principles which set it apart from other civilizations. Much of this set of traditions and knowledge is collected in the Western canon. The term has come to apply to countries whose history has been strongly marked by European immigration or settlement during the 18th and 19th centuries, such as the Americas, and Australasia, and is not restricted to Europe.

The Nobel Prize laureate in Literature Thomas Stearns Eliot, in his 1948 book Notes Towards the Definition of Culture, credited the prominent Christian influence upon the European culture: "It is in Christianity that our arts have developed; it is in Christianity that the laws of Europe have--until recently--been rooted."

Art

Prehistoric art 
Surviving European prehistoric art mainly comprises sculpture and rock art. It includes the oldest known representation of the human body, the Venus of Hohle Fel, dating from 40,000 to 35,000 BC, found in Schelklingen, Germany, and the Löwenmensch figurine, from about 30,000 BC, the oldest undisputed piece of figurative art. The Swimming Reindeer of about 11,000 BCE is among the finest Magdalenian carvings in bone or antler of animals in the art of the Upper Paleolithic. At the beginning of the Mesolithic in Europe, the figurative sculpture was greatly reduced, and remained a less common element in art than relief decoration of practical objects until the Roman period, despite some works such as the Gundestrup cauldron from the European Iron Age and the Bronze Age Trundholm sun chariot. The oldest European cave art dates back to 40,800 and can be found in the El Castillo Cave in Spain, but cave art exists across the continent. Rock painting was also performed on cliff faces, but fewer of those paintings have survived because of erosion. One well-known example is the rock paintings of Astuvansalmi in the Saimaa area of Finland.

The Rock Art of the Iberian Mediterranean Basin forms a distinct group with the human figure the main focus, often seen in large groups, with battles, dancing, and hunting all represented, as well as other activities and details such as clothing. The figures are generally rather sketchily depicted in thin paint, with the relationships between the groups of humans and animals more carefully depicted than individual figures. Prehistoric Celtic art is another distinct grouping from much of Iron Age Europe and survives mainly in the form of high-status metalwork skillfully decorated with complex, elegant, and mostly abstract designs, often using curving and spiral forms. Full-length human figures of any size are so rare that their absence may represent a religious taboo. As the Romans conquered Celtic territories, the style vanished, except in the British Isles, where it influenced the Insular style of the Early Middle Ages.

Classical art 

Ancient Greek art stands out among that of other ancient cultures for its development of naturalistic but idealized depictions of the human body, in which largely nude male figures were generally the focus of innovation. The rate of stylistic development between about 750 and 300 BC was remarkable by ancient standards, and in surviving works is best seen in Ancient Greek sculpture. There were important innovations in painting, which have to be essentially reconstructed due to the lack of original survivals of quality, other than the distinct field of painted pottery. Black-figure pottery and the subsequent red-figure pottery are famous and influential examples of the Ancient Greek decorative arts. Roman art was influenced by Greece and can in part be taken as a descendant of ancient Greek painting and sculpture, but was also strongly influenced by the more local Etruscan art of Italy. The sculpture was perhaps considered as the highest form of art by Romans, but figure painting was also very highly regarded. The Roman sculpture is primarily portraiture derived from the upper classes of society as well as depictions of the gods. However, Roman painting does have important unique characteristics. Among surviving Roman paintings are wall paintings, many from villas in Campania, in Southern Italy, especially at Pompeii and Herculaneum. Such painting can be grouped into four main "styles" or periods and may contain the first examples of trompe-l'œil, pseudo-perspective, and pure landscape. Early Christian art grew out of Roman popular, and later Imperial, art and adapted its iconography from these sources.

Medieval art 
Medieval art can be broadly categorized into the Byzantine art of the Eastern Roman Empire, and the Gothic art that emerged in Western Europe over the same period.

Byzantine art was strongly influenced by its classical heritage but distinguished itself by the development of a new, abstract, aesthetic, marked by anti-naturalism and a favor for symbolism. The subject matter of monumental Byzantine art was primarily religious and imperial: the two themes are often combined, as in the portraits of later Byzantine emperors that decorated the interior of the sixth-century church of Hagia Sophia in Constantinople. However, the Byzantines inherited the Early Christian distrust of monumental sculpture in religious art, and produced only reliefs, of which very few survivals are anything like life-size, in sharp contrast to the medieval art of the West, where monumental sculpture revived from Carolingian art onwards. Small ivories were also mostly in relief. The so-called "minor arts" were very important in Byzantine art, and luxury items, including ivories carved in relief as formal presentation Consular diptychs or caskets such as the Veroli casket, hardstone carvings, enamels, glass, jewelry, metalwork, and figured silks were produced in large quantities throughout the Byzantine era.

Migration Period art includes the art of the Germanic tribes on the continent, as well the start of the distinct Insular art or Hiberno-Saxon art of the Anglo-Saxon and Celtic fusion in the British Isles. It covers many different styles of art including the polychrome style and the Scythian and Germanic animal style. After Christianization, Migration Period art developed into various schools of Early Medieval art in Western Europe, which are normally classified by region, such as Anglo-Saxon art and Carolingian art, before the continent-wide styles of Romanesque art and finally Gothic art developed.Romanesque art and Gothic art dominated Western and Central Europe from approximately 1000 AD to the rise of the Renaissance style in the 15th century or later, depending on the region. The Romanesque style was greatly influenced by Byzantine and Insular art. Religious art, such as church sculpture and decorated manuscripts, was particularly prominent. Art of the period was characterized by a very vigorous style in both sculpture and painting. Colors tended to be very striking and mostly primary. Compositions usually had little depth, and needed to be flexible to be squeezed into the shapes of historiated initials, column capitals, and church tympanums. Figures often varied in size in relation to their importance, and landscape backgrounds, if attempted at all, were closer to abstract decorations than realism.

Gothic art developed from Romanesque art in Northern France in the 12th century AD, led by the concurrent development of Gothic architecture. It spread to all of Western Europe, and much of Southern and Central Europe. In the late 14th century, the sophisticated court style of International Gothic developed, which continued to evolve until the late 15th century. In many areas, especially England and Germany, Late Gothic art continued well into the 16th century.  Gothic art was often typological in nature, showing the stories of the New Testament and the Old Testament side by side. Saints' lives were often depicted. Images of the Virgin Mary changed from the Byzantine iconic form to a more human and affectionate mother, often showing the refined manners of a courtly lady.

Secular art came into its own during the gothic period alongside the creation of a bourgeois class who could afford to patronize the arts and commission works. Increased literacy and a growing body of secular vernacular literature encouraged the representation of secular themes in art. With the growth of cities, trade guilds were formed, and artists were often required to be members of a painters' guild—as a result, because of better record-keeping, more artists are known to us by name in this period than any previous.

Renaissance art 

Renaissance art emerged as a distinct style in northern Italy from around 1420, in parallel with developments which occurred in philosophy, literature, music, and science. It took as its foundation the art of Classical antiquity, but was also influenced by the art of Northern Europe and contemporary scientific knowledge. Renaissance artists painted a wide variety of themes. Religious altarpieces, fresco cycles, and small works for private devotion were very popular. Painters in both Italy and northern Europe frequently turned to Jacobus de Voragine's Golden Legend (1260), a highly influential sourcebook for the lives of saints that had already had a strong influence on Medieval artists. Interest in classical antiquity and Renaissance humanism also resulted in many Mythological and history paintings. Decorative ornament, often used in painted architectural elements, was especially influenced by classical Roman motifs.

Techniques characteristic of Renaissance art include the use of proportion and linear perspective; foreshortening, to create an illusion of depth; sfumato, a technique of softening of sharp outlines by subtle blending of tones to give the illusion of depth or three-dimensionality; and chiaroscuro, the effect of using a strong contrast between light and dark to give the illusion of depth or three-dimensionality.

Mannerism, Baroque and Rococo 
Renaissance Classicism spawned two different movements—Mannerism and the Baroque. Mannerism, a reaction against the idealist perfection of Classicism, employed distortion of light and spatial frameworks in order to emphasize the emotional content of a painting and the emotions of the painter. Where High Renaissance art emphasizes proportion, balance, and ideal beauty, Mannerism exaggerates such qualities, often resulting in compositions that are asymmetrical or unnaturally elegant. The style is notable for its intellectual sophistication as well as its artificial (as opposed to naturalistic) qualities. It favors compositional tension and instability rather than the balance and clarity of earlier Renaissance paintings.

In contrast, Baroque art took the representationalism of the Renaissance to new heights, emphasizing detail, movement, lighting, and drama. Perhaps the best-known Baroque painters are Caravaggio, Rembrandt, Peter Paul Rubens, and Diego Velázquez. Baroque art is often seen as part of the Counter-Reformation— the revival of spiritual life in the Roman Catholic Church. Religious and political themes are widely explored within the Baroque artistic context, and both paintings and sculptures are characterized by a strong element of drama, emotion, and theatricality. Baroque art was particularly ornate and elaborate in nature, often using rich, warm colors with dark undertones. Dutch Golden Age painting is a distinct subset of Baroque, leading to the development of secular genres such as still life, genre paintings of everyday scenes, and landscape painting.

By the 18th century, Baroque art had developed into Rococo in France. Rococo art was even more elaborate than the Baroque, but it was less serious and more playful. The artistic movement no longer placed emphasis on politics and religion, focusing instead on lighter themes such as romance, celebration, and appreciation of nature. Furthermore, it sought inspiration from the artistic forms and ornamentation of Far Eastern Asia, resulting in the rise in favor of porcelain figurines and chinoiserie in general. Rococo soon fell out of favor, being seen by many as a gaudy and superficial movement emphasizing aesthetics over meaning.

Neoclassical, Romanticism, and Realism 
Neoclassicism began in the 18th century as a counter-movement opposing Rococo. It desired for a return to the simplicity, order, and 'purism' of classical antiquity, especially ancient Greece and Rome. Neoclassicism was the artistic component of the intellectual movement known as the Enlightenment. Neoclassicism had become widespread in Europe throughout the 18th century, especially in the United Kingdom. In many ways, Neoclassicism can be seen as a political movement as well as an artistic and cultural one. Neoclassical art places emphasis on order, symmetry, and classical simplicity; common themes in Neoclassical art include courage and war, as were commonly explored in ancient Greek and Roman art. Ingres, Canova, and Jacques-Louis David are among the best-known neoclassicists.

Just as Mannerism rejected Classicism, Romanticism rejected the aesthetic of the Neoclassicists, specifically the highly objective and ordered nature of Neoclassicism, favoring instead a more individual and emotional approach to the arts. Emphasis was placed on nature, especially when aiming to portray the power and beauty of the natural world, and emotions. Romantic art often used colors in order to express feelings and emotions. Romantic art was inspired by ancient Greek and Roman art and mythology, but also takes much of its aesthetic qualities from medievalism and Gothicism, as well as later mythology and folklore. Among the greatest Romantic artists were Eugène Delacroix, Francisco Goya, J.M.W. Turner, John Constable, Caspar David Friedrich, and William Blake.

In response to these changes caused by Industrialisation, the movement of Realism emerged, which sought to accurately portray the conditions and hardships of the poor in the hopes of changing society. In contrast with Romanticism, which was essentially optimistic about mankind, Realism offered a stark vision of poverty and despair. While Romanticism glorified nature, Realism portrayed life in the depths of an urban wasteland. Like Romanticism, Realism was a literary as well as an artistic movement. Other contemporary movements were more Historicist in nature, such as the Pre-Raphaelite Brotherhood, which attempted to return art to its state of "purity" prior to Raphael, and the Arts and Crafts Movement, which reacted against the impersonality of mass-produced goods and advocated a return to medieval craftsmanship.

Music

Classical music

Pre-1600
This broad era encompasses early music, which generally comprises Medieval music (500–1400) and Renaissance music (1400–1600), but sometimes includes Baroque music (1600–1760).

Post-1600
This era includes the common practice period from approximately 1600 to 1900, as well as the modernist and postmodernist styles that emerged after 1900 and which continue to the present day.

Modern music 
Folk music: Europe has a wide and diverse range of indigenous music, sharing common features in rural, traveling, or maritime communities. Folk music is embedded in an unwritten, oral tradition, but was increasingly transcribed from the nineteenth century onwards. Many classical composers used folk melodies, and folk has influenced some popular music in Europe. See the list of European folk music.

Popular music: Europe has also imported many different genres of popular music, including Rock, Blues, R&B Soul, Jazz, Hip-Hop and Pop. Various genres associated with and named after Europe are rooted in Electronic dance music (EDM), and include Europop, Eurodisco, Eurodance and Eurobeat.

Media

Television

Radio

Newspapers

Architecture

Prehistoric architecture 
The Neolithic long house was a long, narrow timber dwelling built by the first farmers in Europe beginning at least as early as the period 5000 to 6000 BC. Knap of Howar and Skara Brae, the Orkney Islands, Scotland, are stone-built Neolithic settlements dating from 3,500 BC. Megaliths found in Europe and the Mediterranean were also erected in the Neolithic period. See Neolithic architecture.

Ancient classical architecture 

Ancient Greek architecture was produced by the Greek-speaking people whose culture flourished on the Greek mainland, the Peloponnese, the Aegean Islands, and in colonies in Anatolia and Italy for a period from about 900 BC until the 1st century AD. Ancient Greek architecture is distinguished by its highly formalized characteristics, both of structure and decoration. The formal vocabulary of ancient Greek architecture, in particular the division of architectural style into three defined orders: the Doric Order, the Ionic Order, and the Corinthian Order, was to have a profound effect on the Western architecture of later periods.

Ancient Roman architecture adopted the external language of classical Greek architecture for the purposes of the ancient Romans, but differed from Greek buildings, becoming a new architectural style. The two styles are often considered one body of classical architecture. Roman architecture flourished in the Roman Republic and even more so under the Empire, when the great majority of surviving buildings were constructed. It used new materials, particularly concrete, and newer technologies such as the arch and the dome to make buildings that were typically strong and well-engineered. Large numbers remain in some form across the empire, sometimes complete and still in use.

Medieval architecture 
Romanesque architecture combines features of ancient Roman and Byzantine buildings and other local traditions. It is known for its massive quality, thick walls, round arches, sturdy pillars, groin vaults, large towers, and decorative arcading. Each building has clearly defined forms, frequently of a very regular, symmetrical plan; the overall appearance is one of simplicity when compared with the Gothic buildings that were to follow. The style can be identified right across Europe, despite regional characteristics and different materials, and is most frequently seen in churches. Plenty of examples of this architecture are found alongside the Camino de Santiago.

Gothic architecture flourished in Europe during the High and Late Middle Ages. It evolved from Romanesque architecture and was succeeded by Renaissance architecture. Originating in 12th century France and lasting into the 16th century, Gothic architecture was known during the period as Opus Francigenum ("French work"), with the term Gothic first appearing during the latter part of the Renaissance. Its characteristics include the pointed arch, the ribbed vault (which evolved from the joint vaulting of Romanesque architecture), and the flying buttress. Gothic architecture is most familiar as the architecture of many of the great cathedrals, abbeys, and churches of Europe.

Renaissance and baroque architecture 

Renaissance architecture began in the early 14th and lasted until the early 17th century. It demonstrates a conscious revival and development of certain elements of ancient Greek and Roman architectural thought and material culture, particularly the symmetry, proportion, geometry, and the regularity of parts of ancient buildings. Developed first in Florence, with Filippo Brunelleschi as one of its innovators, the Renaissance style quickly spread to other Italian cities. The style was carried to France, Germany, England, Russia, and other parts of Europe at different dates and with varying degrees of impact

Palladian architecture was derived from and inspired by the designs of the Italian Renaissance architect Andrea Palladio (1508–1580). Palladio's work was strongly based on the symmetry, perspective, and values of the formal classical temple architecture of the Ancient Greeks and Romans. From the 17th century, Palladio's interpretation of this classical architecture was adapted as the style known as Palladianism. It continued to develop until the end of the 18th century, and continued to be popular in Europe throughout the 19th and early 20th centuries, where it was frequently employed in the design of public and municipal buildings.

Baroque architecture began in 16th-century Italy. It took the Roman vocabulary of Renaissance architecture and used it in a new rhetorical and theatrical fashion. It was, initially at least, directly linked to the Counter-Reformation, a movement within the Catholic Church to reform itself in response to the Protestant Reformation. Baroque was characterized by new explorations of form, light, and shadow, and a freer treatment of classical elements. It reached its extreme form in the Rococo style.

19th-century architecture 

Revivalism was a hallmark of nineteenth-century European architecture. Revivals of the Romanesque, Gothic, Renaissance, and Baroque styles all took place, alongside revivals of the Classical styles. Regional styles, such as English Tudor, were also revived, as well as non-European styles, such as Chinese (Chinoiserie) and Egyptian. These revivals often used elements of the original style in a freer way than original examples, sometimes borrowing from multiple styles at once. At Alnwick Castle, for example, Gothic revival elements were added to the exterior of the original medieval castle, while the interiors were designed in a Renaissance style.

Art Nouveau architecture was a reaction against the eclectic styles which dominated European architecture in the second half of the 19th century. It was expressed through decoration. The buildings were covered with ornament in curving forms, based on flowers, plants, or animals: butterflies, peacocks, swans, irises, cyclamens, orchids, and water lilies. Façades were asymmetrical, and often decorated with polychrome ceramic tiles. The decoration usually suggested movement; there was no distinction between the structure and the ornament.

20th-century and modern architecture 
Art Deco architecture began in Brussels in 1903–4. Early buildings had clean lines, rectangular forms, and no decoration on the facades; they marked a clean break with the art nouveau style. After the First World War, art deco buildings of steel and reinforced concrete began to appear in large cities across Europe and the United States. Buildings became more decorated, and interiors were extremely colorful and dynamic, combining sculpture, murals, and ornate geometric design in marble, glass, ceramics, and stainless steel.

Modernist architecture is a term applied to a group of styles of architecture that emerged in the first half of the 20th century and became dominant after World War II. It was based upon new technologies of construction, particularly the use of glass, steel, and reinforced concrete; and upon a rejection of the traditional neoclassical architecture and Beaux-Arts styles that were popular in the 19th century. Modernist architecture continued to be the dominant architectural style for institutional and corporate buildings into the 1980s, when it was challenged by postmodernism.

Expressionist architecture is a form of modern architecture that began during the first decades of the 20th century, in parallel with the expressionist visual and performing arts that especially developed and dominated in Germany. In the 1950s, the second movement of expressionist architecture developed, initiated by the Ronchamp Chapel Notre-Dame-du-Haut (1950–1955) by Le Corbusier. The style was individualistic, but tendencies include Distortion of form for an emotional effect, efforts at achieving the new, original, and visionary, and a conception of architecture as a work of art.

Postmodern architecture emerged in the 1960s as a reaction against the austerity, formality, and lack of variety of modern architecture, particularly in the international style advocated by Le Corbusier and Ludwig Mies van der Rohe. Embraced in the USA first, it spread to Europe. In contrast to Modernist buildings, Postmodern buildings have curved forms, decorative elements, asymmetry, bright colors, and features often borrowed from earlier periods. Colors and textures unrelated to the structure or function of the building. While rejecting the "puritanism" of modernism, it called for a return to ornament, and an accumulation of citations and collages borrowed from past styles. It borrowed freely from classical architecture, rococo, neoclassical architecture, the Viennese secession, the British arts and crafts movement, the German Jugendstil.

Deconstructivist architecture is a movement of postmodern architecture which appeared in the 1980s, which gives the impression of the fragmentation of the constructed building. It is characterized by an absence of harmony, continuity, or symmetry. Its name comes from the idea of "Deconstruction", a form of semiotic analysis developed by the French philosopher Jacques Derrida. Besides fragmentation, Deconstructivism often manipulates the structure's surface skin and creates by non-rectilinear shapes which appear to distort and dislocate elements of architecture. The finished visual appearance is characterized by unpredictability and controlled chaos.

Literature

Classical literature

Medieval literature

Renaissance literature

Early modern literature

Modern literature

Film 

Antoine Lumière realized, on 28 December 1895, the first projection, with the Cinematograph, in Paris. 
In 1897, Georges Méliès established the first cinema studio on a rooftop property in Montreuil, near Paris.
Some notable European film movements include German Expressionism, Italian neorealism, French New Wave, Polish Film School, New German Cinema, Portuguese Cinema Novo, Movida Madrileña, Czechoslovak New Wave, Dogme 95, New French Extremity, and Romanian New Wave.

The cinema of Europe has its own awards, the European Film Awards.
Main festivals : Cannes Film Festival (France), Berlin International Film Festival (Germany). The Venice Film Festival (Italy) or Mostra Internazionale d'Arte Cinematografica di Venezia, is the oldest film festival in the world. Philippe Binant realized, on 2 February 2000, the first digital cinema projection in Europe.

Science

Classical science 
See: History of science in classical antiquity

Medieval science 
See: post-classical science

Renaissance science 
See: History of science in the Renaissance

Early modern science 
See: Scientific Revolution, Science in the Age of Enlightenment, and Romanticism in Science

Modern science 
See: Science and Technology in Europe

Philosophy 
European philosophy is a predominant strand of philosophy globally, and is central to philosophical enquiry in the Americas and most other parts of the world which have fallen under its influence. The Greek schools of philosophy in antiquity provide the basis of philosophical discourse that extends to today. Christian thought had a huge influence on many fields of European philosophy (as European philosophy has been on Christian thought too), sometimes as a reaction. Many political ideologies were theorized in Europe, such as capitalism, communism, fascism, socialism, or anarchism.

Classical 
See: Ancient philosophy

Medieval 
See: Medieval philosophy

Renaissance 
See: Renaissance philosophy

Modern 
See: Age of Enlightenment.

Contemporary 
See: 20th-century philosophy and Contemporary philosophy

Religion 

Christianity has been the dominant religion shaping European culture for at least the last 1700 years. Modern philosophical thought has very much been influenced by Christian philosophers such as St Thomas Aquinas and Erasmus. And throughout most of its history, Europe has been nearly equivalent to Christian culture, The Christian culture was the predominant force in western civilization, guiding the course of philosophy, art, and science. The notion of "Europe and the Western World" has been intimately connected with the concept of "Christianity and Christendom" many even attribute Christianity for being the link that created a unified European identity.

Christianity 

Christianity is the largest religion in Europe, with 76.2% of Europeans considering themselves Christian in 2010, As 2010, Catholics were the largest Christian group in Europe, accounting for more than 48% of European Christians. The second-largest Christian group in Europe was the Orthodox, who made up 32% of European Christians. About 19% of European Christians were part of the Protestant tradition. Russia is the largest Christian country in Europe by population, followed by Germany and Italy. In 2012 Europe constituted in absolute terms the world's largest Christian population. Historically, Europe has been the center and cradle of Christian civilization.

Catholicism 
See: Catholic Church in Europe

Protestantism 
See: Protestant Reformation

Eastern Orthodoxy 
See: Eastern Orthodoxy in Europe

Islam

Judaism

Other religions 
See: Hinduism by country, Buddhism in Europe, Sikhism by country

Atheism 
See: Religion in Europe, History of Atheism, Atheism during the Age of Enlightenment

Cuisine 

The cuisines of European countries are diverse by themselves, although there are common characteristics that distinguish European cooking from cuisines of Asian countries and others. Compared with traditional cooking of Asian countries, for example, meat is more prominent and substantial in serving-size. Steak, in particular, is a common dish across Europe. European cuisines also put substantial emphasis on sauces as condiments, seasonings, or accompaniments (in part due to the difficulty of seasonings penetrating the often larger pieces of meat used in European cooking). Dairy products are often utilized in the cooking process. Wheat-flour bread has long been the most common source of starch in this cuisine, along with pasta, dumplings, and pastries, although the potato has become a major starch plant in the diet of Europeans and their diaspora since the European colonization of the Americas.

Fashion 

The earliest definite examples of needles originate from the Solutrean culture, which existed in France and Spain from 19,000 BC to 15,000 BC. The earliest dyed flax fibers have been found in a cave in the Republic of Georgia and date back to 36,000 BP. See Clothing in ancient Rome, 1100–1200 in fashion, 1200–1300 in fashion, 1300–1400 in fashion, 1400–1500 in fashion, 1500–1550 in fashion, 1550–1600 in fashion, 1600–1650 in fashion, 1650–1700 in fashion, Textile manufacture during the Industrial Revolution

Sport

History

Olympics 
See: History of the Olympics

Contemporary sports 

 Association football, which has its origins in the United Kingdom. The oldest association is The Football Association of England (1863), and the first international match was between Scotland and England (1872). It is now the world's most popular sport and is played throughout Europe.
 Cricket has its origins in southeast England. It is popular throughout England and Wales, and parts of the Netherlands. It is also popular in other areas in Northwest Europe. It is however, very popular worldwide, especially in Africa, Australia, New Zealand, and the Indian subcontinent.
 Cycling, which is also immensely popular as a means of transport, has most of its sporting adherents in Europe. Tour de France is the world's most-watched live annual sporting event. The bicycle itself is probably from France (see History of the bicycle).
 The discus throw, javelin throw, and shot put have their origins in ancient Greece. The Olympics, both ancient and modern, have their origins too in Europe, and have a massive influence globally.
 Field Hockey, as a modern game, began in 18th century England, with Ireland having the oldest federation. It is popular in Western Europe, the Indian subcontinent, Australia and East Asia. Ice hockey, popular in Europe and North America, may derive from this sport.
 Golf, one of the most popular sports in Europe, Asia, and North America, has its origins in Scotland, with the oldest course being at Musselburgh.
 Handball, which is popular in Europe and elsewhere, has its origins in antiquity. The modern game is from Denmark and Germany, with Germany having been involved in both the first women's and men's internationals.
 Rugby League and Rugby Union were both created in England. They both have similar origins to football. Rugby Union is the older of the two codes and has rules that date from 1845 (see articles: History of rugby league and History of rugby union). They acrimoniously split in the late 19th century over the treatment of injured players. Rugby league gradually changed its laws over the next century with the end result that today both sports have little in common, apart from the basics. They have both been carried abroad by colonization, particularly to many former British colonies. American Football and Canadian Football are derivatives of rugby.
 Tennis which originates from England, and related games such as Table Tennis, derive from the game Real Tennis which is from France. It is popular throughout the world.

Regional sports 

In addition, Europe has numerous national or regional sports which do not command a large international following outside of emigrant groups. These include:
 Alpine Wrestling in Switzerland.
 Bandy in Russia, Sweden, and Finland
 Basque Pelota in parts of Spain and France, and which has been brought to the Americas by emigrants.
 Bullfighting in Spain, Portugal, and parts of southern France near the Spanish Border.
 Gaelic Football in Ireland, which influenced Australian rules football.
 Gaelic Handball (Ireland) which was taken to the United States in the form of American Handball.
 Hurling in Ireland.
 Korfbal in the Netherlands and Belgium.
 Pesäpallo (Boboll) in Finland
 Pétanque, Boules, Irish Road Bowling, Skittles, Bocce, and Bowls and others are variations of bowling games which are popular throughout Europe and have been spread around the world.
 Rounders from England now popular in northwest Europe from which Baseball derives.
 Shinty in Scotland, United Kingdom, which influenced ice hockey in Canada (see also Shinny).
 Trotting in southern Europe.

Some sports competitions feature a European team gathering athletes from different European countries. These teams use the European flag as an emblem. The most famous of these competitions is the Ryder Cup in golf. Some sporting organizations hold European Championships like European Cricket Council, the European Games, the European Rugby Cup (Club/Regional competition), the European SC Championships, the FIRA - Association of European Rugby, the IIHF, the Mitropa Cup, the Rugby League European Federation - European Championship, the Sport in the European Union and the UEFA.

European politics

Overview 
See: History of Europe

European Union 
See: Politics of the European Union

Capital of Culture 

Each year since 1985 one or more cities across Europe are chosen as European Capital of Culture, an EU initiative. Here are the past and future capitals:

 1985: Athens
 1986: Florence
 1987: Amsterdam
 1988: Berlin
 1989: Paris
 1990: Glasgow
 1991: Dublin
 1992: Madrid
 1993: Antwerp
 1994: Lisbon
 1995: Luxembourg
 1996: Copenhagen
 1997: Thessaloniki
 1998: Stockholm
 1999: Weimar
 2000: Avignon, Bergen, Bologna, Brussels, Helsinki, Kraków, Prague, Reykjavík, Santiago de Compostela
 2001: Rotterdam, Porto
 2002: Bruges, Salamanca
 2003: Graz
 2004: Genoa, Lille
 2005: Cork
 2006: Patras
 2007: Sibiu, Luxembourg, Greater Region
 2008: Liverpool, Stavanger
 2009: Vilnius, Linz
 2010: Essen (representing the Ruhr), Istanbul, Pécs
 2011: Turku, Tallinn
 2012: Guimarães, Maribor
 2013: Marseille, Košice
 2014: Umeå, Riga 
 2015: Mons, Plzeň
 2016: San Sebastián, Wrocław
 2017: Aarhus, Paphos
 2018: Valletta, Malta and Leeuwarden
 2019: Plovdiv and Matera
 2020: Galway and Rijeka

Symbols

See also 

 Compendium of cultural policies and trends in Europe
 Cultural policies of the European Union
 Europalia
 European dances
 European Heritage Day
 Europeanisation
 Romano-Germanic culture
 Western culture
 Westernization

References

Bibliography

External links 

 Eurolinguistix.com
 Europe.org.uk - online European culture magazine (EU London Office)
 TheEuropeanLibrary.org, The European Library, gateway to Europe's national libraries
 Europeana.eu European Digital Library
 Europa.eu, EU Culture Portal (archived)